Cantigas numa Língua Antiga is an album by the Portuguese fado singer Amália Rodrigues. Recorded in 1977 and released by Columbia, it was her first album of original material for three years. It was also released under the title Songs In an Ancient Tongue, with the track titles translated into English.

Track listing

Personnel
Amália Rodrigues – vocals
Fontes Rocha – Guitarra Portuguesa,  Portuguese guitar
Martinho d'Assunção – Viola,  Classical guitar

Additional personnel
Augusto Cabrita – photography
Manuel Correia – photography

References

1977 albums
Amália Rodrigues albums
Fado
Portuguese-language albums